Tardan may refer to:
Chlorprothixene, a pharmaceutical
Tardan, Iran, a village in Markazi Province, Iran